The Islands of the Potomac Wildlife Management Area is a Wildlife Management Area (WMA) consisting of 30 islands in the Potomac River in Maryland along its border with the state of Virginia. It is administered by the Maryland Department of Natural Resources.

Islands of the Potomac WMA protects  of wildlife habitat in Allegany, Washington, Frederick and Montgomery counties. The islands are accessible only by boat. Within the WMA is established the Islands of the Potomac Wildland (see Maryland Wildland), consisting of about 82% of the total area.

Of the 30 islands, three in Montgomery County are open to public hunting: Oxley Island, Mason Island and Maddox Island.

See also
 Heater's Island Wildlife Management Area, also a Potomac island

References

External links
Islands of the Potomac WMA

Wildlife management areas of Maryland
Protected areas of Allegany County, Maryland
Protected areas of Washington County, Maryland
Protected areas of Frederick County, Maryland
Protected areas of Montgomery County, Maryland